A walking city is a type of city that is created to avoid internal transportation, and therefore be small enough that a person can use walking to navigate the city. It is characterized by narrow, often winding streets. Its transport system is inherently egalitarian, with no one being disadvantaged by a lack of transport, unlike modern automotive cities. Walkability within areas positively impacts equity, sustainability, health, social benefits, less demand on other modes, economic development, and enjoyment.

History 

Before the advent of machine-powered transportation, walking cities were common, due to land transportation being a scarce commodity. People arranged cities to reduce the amount of one-way trips and the necessary length of these trips. This meant that features of modern cities such as one-way streets would have been avoided by city planners. Circulation patterns were sought that assured people would travel the least distance. The crooked streets of medieval towns, while seemingly inefficient, were actually created to enable circumferential routes.

In Europe, the walking city was dominant up to 1850, when walking, or at most, horse-drawn transport, was the primary means of movement. 

Many walking cities around the world became overrun by cars during the 1950s and 1960s, but some gradually reclaimed their walking qualities, such as Freiburg and Munich in Germany and Copenhagen in Denmark.

Features 
In walking cities, everything was "crammed into the smallest space possible". Streets were by necessity narrow, overhanging upper stories were common, and they were often surrounded by walls for defensive purposes. Urban planning and policies related to zoning and infrastructure allow modern cities to be more walkable. Urban sprawl and past city planning affects current public transit systems, such as the United States which spends more public tax dollars on transit but is less accessible.

Examples 
Some of the most walkable cities around the world include Florence, Athens, Edinburgh, Madrid, and Washington D.C. The walkability of an area is determined by factors such as density, functional mix, and access networks. In addition, the Institute for Transportation and Development Policy (ITDP) ranked the walkability of cities according to the closeness to car-free places (100m), closeness to healthcare and education (1km), and by small size of city blocks. Components including the allocation of funds toward public transit and walkways, as well as zoning and infrastructure changes contribute to the success of walkable cities. In Spain, Madrid combines inner-city transit with light-rail trains to provide over 89% of the population access to the transit system from less than one kilometer away.

Environmental Impact 
Walkable cities encourage walking, biking, and public transit opposed to passenger vehicles, which decreases the use of fossil fuels. In the United States, transportation is the largest contributor of green house gas emissions, accounting for 27% of the total in 2020. Moreover, increased walkability results in less air and noise pollution, as well as additional land for green space that is not being used by vehicles. These factors along with others tackle environmental disproportionality and injustice through ameliorating climate change and diversifying accessibility. The United Nations outlines 17 different Sustainable Development Goals that aim to tackle social and environmental problems. Walking cities address SDG #11: Sustainable Cities and Communities through urban planning that allows access to better transportation.

See also 
Walkability
Automotive city
Carfree city

Pedestrian village
Transit-oriented development
Urban vitality

References 

Cities by type